American Teen may refer to:

American Teen (film), a 2008 documentary film by Nanette Burstein
American Teen (album), a 2017 album by Khalid
American Teen (song), the title track of the album

See also 
American Teenager, a 2022 song by Ethel Cain